The 1920 Úrvalsdeild is an season of top-flight Icelandic football.

Overview
It was contested by 3 teams, and Víkingur won the championship.

League standings

Results

References

Úrvalsdeild karla (football) seasons
Iceland
Iceland
Urvalsdeild